Chaturthi refers to the fourth day of a lunar fortnight in the Hindu calendar.

Festivals

 Karak Chaturthi (Karvā Chauth): It is celebrated on Chaturthī of Krishna Paksha (waning lunar phase) of Kārtika Month as per the Purnimanta calendar. During this vrata, Parvati and Shiva are worshipped, along with Kartikeya and Ganesha. The day is also known as Vakratunda Sankashti Chaturthi.
 Bahula Chaturthi (Bol Chauth): This Vrat is observed on Chaturthi of Krishna Paksha of Bhadrapada month as per Purnimanta calendar. The festival is characterized by worshiping Dhenu/Gau Mata (holy cows) & their calves and decorating them. The day is also known as Heramba Ganpati Sankashti Chaturthi.
 Sankashti Chaturthi is the Chaturthi (4th day) of the Krishna Paksha (waning lunar phase) after Purnima (full moon). If this Chaturthi falls on a Mangalvara (Tuesday) it is called Angarki Chaturthi. On this day, the devotees observe strict vrata (fast). They conclude the fast at night after having darshan (auspicious sighting) of the moon preceded by prayers to Ganesha. Devotees believe their wishes would be fulfilled if they pray on this auspicious day. The Ganapati Atharvashesha is recited to seek the blessings of Ganesha.

During each month, Ganesha is worshiped with a different name and peeta (lotus petals). On the Charturti day (4th day after new moon) of each month, the 'Sankashta Ganapathi Pooja' prayer is performed. Each ‘Vratha’ (strict fast) has a purpose and is explained to us by a story known as the ‘Vrata Katha’.  This prayer offering has 13 Vrata Kathas, one for each month and the 13th story is for 'athika' (The Hindu calendar has one extra month every 4 years). The uniqueness of this vrata is that the story pertaining to that month alone has to be recited.

 Vinayaka Chaturthi is the Chaturthi after Amavasya or new moon. Devotees observe the fast for full day and night and meal is consumed the next day.
 This fast is mostly observed in Western and Southern India especially by the Brahmin community (Smarta or Shaiva). The fast is supposed to be strict and only fruit, roots or vegetable products are supposed to be consumed.

 Angarki Sankashti ChaturthiIs the 4th day of the waning lunar phase after the full moon.coming on Tuesday.
 Ganesh Chaturthi is one of prominent Chaturthi on which Ganesha makes his presence on the earth.
 Magha shukla chaturthi: Ganesh Jayanti
 Samvatsari (Kshamavani), falls on Shukla Paksha Bhadrapad.
 Nagula Chaviti

References

04
Hindu calendar